Ischnocampa mundator is a moth of the family Erebidae. It was described by Herbert Druce in 1884. It is found in Costa Rica.

References

 

Ischnocampa
Moths described in 1884